The Institute of Transportation Engineers (ITE) is an international educational and scientific association of transportation professionals who are responsible for meeting mobility and safety needs. ITE facilitates the application of technology and scientific principles to research, planning, functional design, implementation, operation, policy development, and management for any mode of ground transportation.

History
The organization formed in 1930 amid growing public demand for experts to alleviate traffic congestion and the frequency of crashes that came from the rapid development of automotive transportation. It formed as the Institute of Traffic Engineers and its first president was Ernest P. Goodrich.

The organization consists of 10 districts, 62 sections, and 30 chapters from various parts of the world.

Standards development
ITE is also a standards development organization designated by the United States Department of Transportation (USDOT). One of the current standardization efforts is the advanced transportation controller. ITE is also known for publishing articles about trip generation, parking generation, parking demand, and various transportation-related material through ITE Journal, a monthly publication. They also discuss these topics on the ITE Talks Transportation podcast.

Criticism
Urbanists such as Jeff Speck have criticized ITE standards for encouraging towns to build more, wider streets making pedestrians less safe and cities less walkable. Donald Shoup in his book The High Cost of Free Parking argues that ITE estimates give towns the false confidence to regulate minimum parking requirements which reinforce sprawl.

See also
 National Transportation Communications for Intelligent Transportation System Protocol (NTCIP)
 Canadian Institute of Transportation Engineers

References

External links
 

Transportation engineering
Organizations based in Washington, D.C.
Road transport organizations
Organizations established in 1930
Engineering organizations
Transportation organizations based in the United States